Siegburger Mühlengraben is a small canal of North Rhine-Westphalia, Germany. It branches off the Sieg, flows through Siegburg, and joins the Sieg again.

References

Geography of North Rhine-Westphalia
Canals in Germany
CSiegburgerMuhlengraben